Emanuel Scherer (1901 – 5 May 1977) was a Polish politician.

Life
Emanuel Scherer graduated from the Jagiellonian University in Kraków, and became active in the Bund youth movement there. Later he moved to Warsaw, where he continued to be an active politician in the Bund party, in 1935 joining its Central Committee. In 1938 he was elected to the Warsaw City Council.

During World War II Scherer was able to escape to the West, where he took part in the work of the Polish government in exile. He was a member of the National Council of Poland and acted as the Bund's representative following Szmul Zygielbojm's death.

After the war, he emigrated to the United States, where he was a secretary in the International Jewish Labor Bund.

Scherer died in 1977.

References

External links
Emanuel Scherer papers, USHMM

1901 births
1977 deaths
Bundists
Polish emigrants to the United States
General Jewish Labour Bund in Poland politicians
Councillors in Warsaw
Jagiellonian University alumni